William G. Klein (born c. 1948) is a retired American businessman and poker player from Laguna Hills, California.

Poker
Klein's family was a part owner of a manufacturing company. They sold the company and he retired after being diagnosed with throat cancer. Klein entered the 2015 $111,111 One Drop High Roller and finished 2nd receiving a $2,465,522 payout. Klein donated his entire payout to two charities, the Orangewood Children’s Foundation and The Shea Center for Therapeutic Riding.

In 2010, Klein appeared in Season 7 of Game Show Network's High Stakes Poker. Esfandiari held  for a stone cold bluff.

As of 2023, Klein's live tournament winnings exceed $6,100,000.

Rankings
Klein was ranked 18th and 96th on the 2015 & 2016 Money Lists, respectively. Klein is currently ranked #180 on the Global Poker Index with his highest ranking being #158.

References

External links
 Bill Klein Hendon Mob profile

Year of birth missing (living people)
Living people
American poker players
American businesspeople
People from Laguna Hills, California